Verdigris is a BBC Books original novel written by Paul Magrs and based on the long-running British science fiction television series Doctor Who. It features the Third Doctor, Jo Grant and Iris Wildthyme.

Plot
Orbiting above London is a mysterious ship, a duplicate of the St Pancras railway station. The Doctor, with the aid of the adventurer, Iris Wildthyme, bargains to stop creatures determined to infiltrate in the guise of characters from nineteenth century novels. The Doctor is cut off from many of his friends and allies.

Continuity
Iris and her companion Tom reappear in the audio adventures Wildthyme at Large and The Devil in Ms Wildthyme, and the anthology Wildthyme on Top.

Iris Wildthyme would later be played in Big Finish audio dramas by Katy Manning, who played Jo Grant in Doctor Who.

References

External links
The Cloister Library - Verdigris

2000 British novels
2000 science fiction novels
Past Doctor Adventures
Third Doctor novels
The Master (Doctor Who) novels
Novels by Paul Magrs
BBC Books books
Novels set in London